Balbagon is a teardrop-shaped island in northeastern Iloilo, Philippines. It is one of fourteen islands politically administered by the municipality of Carles. There is a small beach resort on the island.

Location and geography 
Balbagon is a narrow, low-lying wooded island northeast of the Panay Island coast in the Visayan Sea. Balbagon is part of barangay Lantangan, on Gigantes Sur. The Coral Cay Beach Resort is on Balbagon and is accessible from Gigantes Sur.

Two minor islands lie east and south of Balbagon. Shoal spits connect both islets to Balbagon.

See also 
 List of islands in the Philippines

References

External links
 Balbagon Island at OpenStreetMap

Islands of Iloilo